Ryszard Kornacki (born 1940 in Lublin) it a Polish poet and essayist from Międzyrzec Podlaski.

 Wyjście z ciszy (1973),
 Szukanie człowieka (1975),
 Złote słońce słowa (1980),
 Puszka Pandory (1985),
 Miniatury (1988),
 Zapis dnia (1990),
 Słoneczna galeria przyrody - wiersze szczawnickie (1993),
 Czarna róża (baśnie i opowieści z Podlasia 1993),
 Wszystkie wątpliwości świata (1994),
 Na krawędzi absurdu (1995),
 Romeo Julia i czas (1997),
 Ciepły dotyk duszy (1999),
 Dopełnianie myśli (1999),
 Międzyrzec w życiorysy wpisany (I 2001, II 2003),
 Podlasie struna czysta (2002),
 Na skraju cienia (2003).

References 

1940 births
Living people
Polish male writers
Polish political writers
Polish poets
Roman Catholic writers